Syagrus weddelliana, also known as the miniature coconut palm or Weddell's palm, is a feather palm in the palm family.

Description
After flowering, it produces small edible fruits that resemble and taste like coconuts.

Distribution and habitat
This palm is native to the State of Rio de Janeiro in southeastern Brazil. It grows naturally in the rainforests of the region. It thrives in the humid shade of the Brazilian rainforests.

Taxonomy
Originally, the palm was placed in the same genus as the coconut palm, under the name Cocos weddelliana, before moving to the queen palm genus, Syagrus, and finally moving to its own genus, Lytocaryum.

Based on morphological and molecular evidence, Larry Noblick and Alan Meerow subsumed Lytocaryum back into Syagrus in 2015.

Horticulture
This palm can be successfully grown in hardiness zones 10b–11. It has been reported that oil extracted from the nuts has been important commercially. This palm should be grown in well draining soil that is constantly moist, but not soggy, as this can lead to lethal root rot.

References

External links
Trebrown Nurseries (Liskeard, Cornwall, UK), Lytocaryum weddellianum 
Palm and Cycad Societies of Australia, Lytocaryum weddellianum 
Jungle Music, Lytocaryum weddellianum 

weddelliana
Endemic flora of Brazil
Plants described in 1871
Edible plants